is a train station in Miyakonojō, Miyazaki Prefecture, Japan. It is operated by JR Kyushu and is on the Kitto Line.

Lines

Layout 
The station consists of a side platform, serving a single track at grade. There is no station building but a shed has been set up at the station entrance as a waiting room. A bike shed is available at the station forecourt.

Adjacent stations

History
Japanese National Railways (JNR) opened Hyūga Shōnai on 15 April 1952 as an additional station on the existing track on the Kitto Line. With the privatization of JNR on 1 April 1987, Tanigashira came under the control of JR Kyushu.

Passenger statistics
In fiscal 2016, the station was used by an average of 65 passengers (boarding only) per day.

See also
List of railway stations in Japan

References

External links

  

Railway stations in Miyazaki Prefecture
Railway stations in Japan opened in 1952